Kulliyat ( kolliyāt) is a collection of the poetry of any one poet. 

Kulliyat is one of the principal collection forms of Urdu poetry. Taken literally, the term signifies a complete collection of one author's poems, but in practice it is also applied to any collection of poems of one type by an author.

See also
Urdu poetry

References

External links
Urdu poetic forms
danw.com

Arabic and Central Asian poetics
Urdu-language poetry
Persian literature

ur:الکلیات